Anandabharati Aiyangar (1786–1846) was an Indian Tamil-language poet and dramatist.

Personal life 
Anandabharati was born in 1786 at Umeiyammalpuram near Thanjavur. He was the son of a wealthy mirasdar (landlord) named Srinivasa Aiyangar. At the age of thirteen, he composed a drama named Nondi in praise of Yaneimelazhagar, the patron deity of his village. Soon afterwards, he migrated, along with his father, to Thiruvallur, where he lived for three years. From the age of fifteen, he was successively employed as the karnam and Samprathi of two different temples in Thanjavur. At the age of twenty-five, he resigned his job and settled down at Tiruvidaimarudur where he spent the rest of his life writing poems. Aiyarappa Tambiran, the dharmakarta of the shrine at Tiruvidaimarudur was so pleased at a drama written by him in praise of the presiding deity that he honored him with the gift of a house and garden, and conferred on him the title of Kavirajaswami. Anandabharati Aiyangar died in 1846 at the age of sixty.

Poetic compositions 
Some of his famous poetical compositions are Uttara Ramayana Kirtana, Desikaprabandham, Bagavata Dasamaskanda Nadagam, Marudur Venba and Muppattirattu.

He also composed hymns in honor of the Saivite shrines at Tiruchirapalli, Tirukadanthai and Thiruvaduthurai.

References 

 

1786 births
1846 deaths
Tamil poets
19th-century Indian poets
Tamil dramatists and playwrights
Dramatists and playwrights from Tamil Nadu
People from Thanjavur district
Indian male poets
18th-century Indian dramatists and playwrights
19th-century Indian dramatists and playwrights
19th-century Indian male writers
Poets from Tamil Nadu
18th-century male writers